Kaftoun is a small Lebanese village located along the north bank of the Walnut River, in the Koura District, North Lebanon. The population of the village is approximately three-hundred, spread around seventy-four houses. They are mostly of Greek Orthodox ancestry.  The name "Kaftoun" in the ancient Aramaic language means "dug from" or "sculpted from" a cliff and also (Kftuna) could means "the domed". 

Both roots of the word lead us to believe that the village of Kaftoun was named after the domed Theotokos Monastery which is carved in the red rock cliffs by the banks of the Jaouz River.

Churches 
Kaftoun has three historic churches: Saint Phocas Church (Mar Foka's), the Church of Saint Sergius and Bacchus 
(Mar Sarkis) 6th century, and the most famed Theotokos Monastery, which houses a two-sided Byzantine icon from the 11th century.

References

External links 
 https://web.archive.org/web/20130903215351/http://www.kaftoun.com/
 Kaftoun, Localiban

Christian communities in Lebanon
Eastern Orthodox Christian communities in Lebanon
Populated places in the North Governorate
Koura District
Populated places in Lebanon